The first elections for members of the London Assembly were held on 4 May 2000, alongside the first mayoral election.

The assembly elections used the mixed member proportional representation, a form of additional member system, with 14 directly elected constituencies and 11 London-wide top-up seats.

Results

|-
!rowspan=3 colspan=2 | Parties
!colspan=10 | Additional member system
!rowspan=2 colspan=5 | Total seats
|-
!colspan=5 |Constituency
!colspan=5 |Region
|-
! Votes !! % !! +/− !! Seats !! +/− 
! Votes !! % !! +/− !! Seats !! +/−
! Total !! +/− !! %
|-

|-
|   || Total || 1,585,785 ||  ||  || 14 ||   || 1,659,630 ||  ||   || 11 ||  || 25 ||   ||
|}

London-wide List Candidates

London Assembly Representation

Labour - 9
Conservative - 9
Liberal Democrat - 4
Green Party - 3

Party Leaders in 2000

Labour - Tony Blair
Conservative - William Hague
Liberal Democrat - Charles Kennedy
Green Party - Mike Woodin and Margaret Wright

See also

London Assembly

References

External links
BBC: Greater London Assembly Election, 2000
MayorWatch London Elections Guide

2000 elections in the United Kingdom
Assembly election
2000
May 2000 events in the United Kingdom